The Constitution Alteration (Referendums) Bill 1977 was an Australian referendum held in 1977 in which electors approved an amendment to the Australian constitution to allow electors in the Australian territories to vote at referendums. Electors in the territories were to be counted towards the national total, but would not be counted toward any state total.

Question
It is proposed to alter the Constitution so as to allow electors in the territories, as well as electors in the states, to vote at referendums on proposed laws to alter the Constitution.

Do you approve the proposed law?

Results

Discussion

At the time of Federation the very few people who lived in the Northern Territory voted as residents of South Australia. Territorians could therefore vote in constitutional referendums. When the Territory was surrendered to the Commonwealth in 1911, however, its citizens lost the vote in such referendums, due to the absence of reference to Territory voters in s. 128. Residents of the Australian Capital Territory were similarly restricted. In 1967 demonstrations against this restriction occurred in Alice Springs, as Territorians expressed their resentment at not being able to vote in the Aboriginals referendum.

In the 1974 referendum the Whitlam Government attempted to amend s. 128 in a double-pronged proposal. Territorial voting rights in referendums were sought, but the Government also proposed that constitutional amendments could be carried with just half of the states — instead of a majority of states — voting in favour. Only New South Wales supported the proposal, but it is likely that, had the Territories section been a separate question, it would have been ratified.

In 1977 the question of Territory votes was relatively uncontroversial, being carried in every state, gaining a national "yes" vote of 77.7 per cent, though Queensland (40.4 per cent) and Tasmania (37.8 per cent) had quite large "no" votes. It has been claimed that the high vote of approval was a reminder of Australia's honourable record of electoral reform — that the amendment had "Australian political tradition behind it". Despite John Paul of the University of New South Wales dismissing the change as the granting of a "hollow privilege", The Canberra Times stated that people in both Territories should be grateful, "for the universal acknowledgment that their natural right to vote in future referendums will now be given the force of law".

References 

 

! colspan="3" style="border-top: 5px solid #cccccc" | Amendments to the Constitution of Australia
|-
| style="width: 30%; text-align: center;" | 5th amendmentAboriginals Amendment (1910)

| style="width: 30%; text-align: center;" | Most recent amendments

External links
State-by-state results of the 1977 referendum

1977 in Australia
Amendments to the Constitution of Australia
1977 referendums
Constitutional referendums in Australia